Trachysomus buquetii is a species of beetle in the family Cerambycidae. It was described by James Thomson in 1858. It is known from Argentina and Brazil.

References

Onciderini
Beetles described in 1858